Lac Vert is a lake in the municipality of Passy, Haute-Savoie, France.

Vert, Lac